An Omele is a type of African drum.

It is a Yoruba word describing a set of three small drums beaten with a distinctive curved stick.

References

Yoruba musical instruments
African drums
Nigerian musical instruments
Drums